Geghasar is a town in the Lori Province of Armenia.

References 
 (as Tapanli)

Populated places in Lori Province